Wartberg im Mürztal is a former municipality in the district of Bruck-Mürzzuschlag in Styria, Austria. Since the 2015 Styria municipal structural reform, it is part of the municipality Sankt Barbara im Mürztal.

References

Cities and towns in Bruck-Mürzzuschlag District